Camp Lake is a lake in Swift County, in the U.S. state of Minnesota.

Camp Lake was so named for a surveyors' camp established near its shore.

See also
List of lakes in Minnesota

References

Lakes of Minnesota
Lakes of Swift County, Minnesota